Cadmus and Harmonia may refer to:

 Cadmus and Harmonia, the founder and first king of Thebes and the Gaeco-Roman goddess of harmony.
 Cadmus and Harmonia, a pseudonym used by John Buchan, Baron Tweedsmuir and Susan Buchan, Baroness Tweedsmuir.